On September 25, 2020, two people were injured in a stabbing outside the former headquarters of the French satirical magazine Charlie Hebdo in Paris. The magazine's headquarters had previously been the site of an Islamic terrorist attack in 2015.

The French Interior Minister Gérald Darmanin considered this to be "clearly an act of Islamist terrorism."

A man from Pakistan, suspected of carrying out the attacks, was arrested near the scene. Six other suspects were subsequently arrested in Paris in connection with the attack.

Investigation

Main suspect 
The main suspect was identified as  a 25-year-old Pakistani man, who is charged with "attempted murder in association with a terrorist enterprise." The suspect acknowledged having carried out the attack for religious reasons. He claimed to be 18 in order to be eligible for social welfare benefits.

Before the attack, he stated in a video that he was seeking vengeance against Charlie Hebdo for publishing caricatures of Islam's prophet Muhammad.

The suspect left his village in the Punjab region in Pakistan in early 2018 and came to Europe, following his brothers and other young men from the village. According to Associated Press, villagers considered the suspect a hero for carrying out the Paris attack. The suspect's father championed his son's actions, but was warned by Pakistani police against speaking publicly.

In France, the suspect moved to Pantin, a working-class district with many immigrants from North Africa, Sub-Saharan Africa and Pakistan. He shared an apartment with several other Pakistanis above a Hookah bar.

Four arrested in December 2020 
In December 2020, four Pakistanis aged 17 to 21 were found to have been in contact with the assailant by authorities and were taken into custody. Two were apprehended in the Gironde, a third in Caen and the fourth in the Paris region. According to authorities, they had "spread their ideology and one of them had expressed his hatred against France before the attack". The investigation had also found numerous messages published on the TikTok social media network where the suspects expressed their hatred towards Muhammad caricatures and "glorified" the assault by their compatriot.

See also 
Charlie Hebdo shooting
Murder of Samuel Paty
2020 Nice stabbing

References 

Stabbing attack
2020 stabbing attack
Charlie Hebdo
2020 stabbing attack
Islamic terrorist incidents in 2020
September 2020 crimes in Europe
September 2020 events in France
Stabbing attacks in 2020
Stabbing attacks in France
Terrorist incidents in France in 2020